Great Island is one of the Falkland Islands. It lies to the west of East Falkland in Falkland Sound. To its north are the Tyssen Islands and to its south Ruggles Island.

References

Islands of the Falkland Islands